St Grellan's Gaelic Football Club was a Gaelic Athletic Association club based in Ballinasloe, County Galway, Ireland.

The team was named in honour of Saint Grellan, patron saint of Ballinasloe.

St Grellan's GFC were the first club to win a record seven Galway county football titles in a row from 1913 to 1919 and were undefeated in the county championship from 1913 to 1930. In 1980, they were also the first Galway Club to reach an All-Ireland Senior Club Football Championship in 1980.

On 1 December 2005, St Grellan's merged with Ballinasloe Hurling Club to form Ballinasloe GAA.

Players

Honours
Senior
Galway Senior Football Championships (20): 1913, 1914, 1915, 1916, 1917, 1918, 1919, 1922, 1923, 1924, 1925, 1926, 1927, 1928, 1929, 1939, 1944, 1945, 1979, 1980
Connacht Senior Club Football Championships (1): 1979 (runners-up in 1980)
All-Ireland Senior Club Football Championship (0): (runners-up in 1980)
Intermediate 

 Galway Intermediate Football Championships (3): 1986, 1992, 2000

Junior

 Galway Junior Football Championships (1): 1997, 2012 (runners-up 2010)
 Connacht Junior Football Championships (1): 2012
 All-Ireland Junior Football Championships (1): 2013

U21

 Galway U21 'A' Football Championships (1): 1977 (runners-up in 1970, 1975)

Minor

 Galway Minor 'A' Football Championships (1): 1974 (runner-up in 1975, 1978, 1981 after Two Replays both involving Extra Time)

Ballinasloe
Gaelic football clubs in County Galway
Gaelic games clubs in County Galway